Kamandurg Fort,  Maharashtra, lies on Vasai-Bhiwandi Road in India. Not much is known about the fort.  It can be reached by foot in approximately 3 hours from the nearby village of Devkundi.

References

Forts in Maharashtra
Thane district